The 2007 Copa del Rey Final was the 105th final since its establishment. The match took place on 23 June 2007 at the Santiago Bernabéu Stadium, Madrid. The match was contested by Sevilla and Getafe, and was refereed by Julián Rodríguez Santiago. With a 1–0 victory, Sevilla – who also triumphed in the 2006–07 UEFA Cup a month earlier – won the trophy for the fourth time in their history; it was their sixth final, while Getafe had reached that stage for the first time ever (they also made it to the final a year later but lost again, to Valencia).

Road to the final

* Match abandoned after 57 minutes at 0–1 due to injury of Sevilla coach Juande Ramos; remainder of the game played on March 18 at the Coliseum Alfonso Pérez, Getafe.

Match details

References

External links
marca.com 
AS.com 

2007
1
Sevilla FC matches
Getafe CF matches